During the 1904–05 English football season, Brentford competed in the Southern League First Division. In its first season at Griffin Park, the club finished in 14th place.

Season summary 

It was a summer of fundraising for the Brentford board during the 1904 off-season, with the club needing to raise money for the work being undertaken at its new Griffin Park ground. £600 was raised (equivalent to £ in ) to pay summer wages for the squad and manager Dick Molyneux was once again able to sign new players soon after the end of the 1903–04 season, with goalkeeper Walter Whittaker, half back Jimmy Tomlinson and forwards John Boag, Fred Hobson, Frank Oliver, Alex Walker and Joe Warrington being signings of note. Molyneux's biggest transfer coup was that of forward Tommy Shanks, who returned to Brentford after 18 months away and off the back of a season in which he had scored 25 goals in Woolwich Arsenal's Football League Second Division triumph. The summer wages allowed full backs Jock Watson, Tommy Davidson and half backs James Bellingham, Jimmy Jay and George Parsonage to be retained, which on paper made the Bees' 1904–05 Southern League First Division squad arguably the club's strongest yet.

Though the season proved to be a slight improvement on the previous one, with two more points won, but finishing one place lower in 14th, Brentford's first season at Griffin Park was a disappointment. Though he finished the season as top scorer and became Brentford's second international player, forward Tommy Shanks could not recreate his prolific form of the previous season and scored just seven goals. The Bees reached the intermediate round of the FA Cup for the third successive season, but could not find a way past fellow First Division club Reading.

Two club records were set during the season:
 Most Southern League draws in a season: 9
 Most Southern League home draws in a season: 7

League table

Results
Brentford's goal tally listed first.

Legend

Southern League First Division

FA Cup 

 Source: 100 Years of Brentford

Playing squad 

 Source: 100 Years of Brentford

Coaching staff

Statistics

Appearances

Goalscorers 

Players listed in italics left the club mid-season.
Source: 100 Years Of Brentford

International caps

Management

Summary

References 

Brentford F.C. seasons
Brentford